Shir LaShalom ( A Song for Peace) is a popular Israeli song that has become an anthem for the Israeli peace movement.

History
Shir LaShalom was written by Yaakov Rotblit and set to music by Yair Rosenblum. It was first performed in 1969 by the Infantry Ensemble (להקת הנחל) of the Israel Defense Forces (IDF) as part of its Sinai Infantry Outpost program, during the War of Attrition between Israel and Egypt. It featured the soloist Miri Aloni, who later became a celebrated folk singer and actor. Many of the other members of the ensemble who took part in the recording of the song went on to become well-known figures in the Israeli entertainment scene. Among them was Danny Sanderson, whose electric guitar solo opened the recording.

Rosenblum originally intended the song for the Israeli Navy Ensemble. He sent it to them from his home in London, with the stipulation that he arrange it himself. When the musical director of the Navy Ensemble, Benny Nagari, rejected that condition, Rosenblum passed the song on to the Nahal Infantry Ensemble, with which he had worked some time previously.

Form and Content
Both in its lyrics and its music, Shir LaShalom was influenced by the Anglo-American anti-war folk-rock songs of the 1960s.

The song expresses a yearning for peace. It mourns comrades who have fallen in battle, and claims to speak for the fallen. The lyrics take issue with the 'culture of bereavement', and with the glorification of war that allegedly exists in Israel. It calls on those who live on to strive for peace. In the line 'The purest of prayers will not bring us back' (הזכה שבתפילות אותנו לא תחזיר hazakah shebatfilot otanu lo takhzir), the lyrics seem to question the value of reciting the Kaddish prayer at the graveside. In a similar vein, they seem to confront an ethos that memorializes fallen soldiers: 'Let the sun penetrate through the flowers [on the graves]' (תנו לשמש לחדור מבעד לפרחים tnu lashemesh lakhador miba'ad la prakhim). In the lines 'Lift your eyes in hope, not through (gun) sights' (שאו עיניים בתקווה, לא דרך כוונות s'u 'enayim betikvah, lo derekh kavanot), the song uses martial concepts in order to subvert those same concepts. The lyrics are critical of songs that appear to glorify the culture of war; for example, Natan Alterman's War of Independence era Magash HaKesef ('Silver Platter'), and the songs Giv'at haTaḥmoshet ('Ammunition Hill', for which Yair Rosenblum also wrote the music) and Balada laḤovesh ('Ballad for a Corpsman') from 1968. Instead, the lyrics ask us to sing of love: 'Sing a song to love, and not to wars' (שירו שיר לאהבה, ולא למלחמות shiru shir la'ahavah velo lamilkhamot).

That line originally read שירו שיר לאהבה, ולא לניצחונות 'Sing a song to love and not to victories'. The original wording extolled peace and love over any tally of victories and conquests. Since the song was intended for a military ensemble, the head of the IDF education department at that time demanded that the line be removed. He argued that the performance of such a song by soldiers before an audience of other soldiers would be damaging to morale. In the end the IDF agreed to the replacement of the last word of the line, ניצחונות nitsakhonot 'victories' by מלחמות milkhamot 'wars', and the song was recorded and published in that revised form.

Both in its tempo and its lyrics the song is evocative of an anthem. Frequent use is made of Hebrew imperative plural forms, like הביאו havi'u 'bring!' and הריעו hari'u 'cheer!' in the last verse. These forms exhort those who hear them to be proactive in the quest for peace. That message, apparently influenced by the hippie counter-culture of the era in which it was written, struck a chord with a large segment of the Israeli population.

Reception

From the outset Shir LaShalom was divisive. Many identified with its message of peace, and some saw in it echoes of the Mt. Scopus Speech given by Yitzhak Rabin on accepting an Honorary Doctorate from Hebrew University (June 28, 1967). In that speech Rabin, who had been Chief of Staff during the Six Day War, had stressed the personal sacrifice both of those Israeli soldiers who fell in the war, in the great Israeli victory, as well as the price paid by the enemy.

However, this was also the period–in the wake of victory in the Six Day War and before the trauma of the Yom Kippur War–when 'Israeli assertiveness' by a portion of the Israeli public was at its peak. Many saw the song as defeatist, and regarded as blasphemous the song's criticism of the supposed 'culture of bereavement'. When the head of the IDF's Central Command in 1969, Rehavam Ze'evi, heard the song performed, he banned the ensemble from appearing in the zone under his command, as did the general in charge of the IDF's southern command, Ariel Sharon.

Over the years, the song became a kind of unofficial political anthem for the Israeli peace movement, particularly for Peace Now (שלום עכשיו Shalom Achshav). It is sung at their meetings and public demonstrations, occasionally in an Arabic version as well.  The left-wing Meretz party purchased exclusive rights to use Shir LaShalom in its 1996 election campaign from the composer and lyricist, and changed the first line of the song from 'Let the sun rise' (תנו לשמש לעלות tnu lashemesh la'alot) into the party slogan 'Let Meretz rise' (תנו למרצ לעלות tnu leMerets la'alot).

At the close of a peace rally on November 4, 1995, those on the podium–Miri Aloni, the groups Gevatron and Irusim, and the statesmen Shimon Peres and Yitzhak Rabin–led the crowd in singing Shir LaShalom. Just after the rally ended, Yitzhak Rabin was assassinated. In his shirt pocket was found a page with the song's lyrics, stained with his blood.

Shir haShalom featured on the Rabin memorial album O Captain ( Rav Ḥovel) released in 2000, and is regularly sung at ceremonies commemorating Rabin's death. In a cross-media poll held in Israel's 50th anniversary year of 1998 to select Israel's Song of the Jubilee, Shir LaShalom placed third.

See also
 Music of Israel
 Culture of Israel
 List of anti-war songs

References

Bibliography

External links

 Hebrew lyrics from the Israeli music site ShiroNet.
 Rabbi Amy Small writes about Shir LaShalom and Rabin's legacy on the 18th anniversary of his assassination.
 In an interview, Miri Aloni talks about singing with Rabin on the night of his assassination.
 Reflections on Shir LaShalom by an Israeli historian and commentator.
 A short essay on music and politics in Israel.

Israeli songs
Hebrew-language songs
Anti-war songs
Assassination of Yitzhak Rabin
Peace songs
1969 songs